Emanuel Brítez (born 26 March 1992) is an Argentine professional footballer who plays as a right-back for Fortaleza.

Career
Brítez has spent his entire career to-date with Unión Santa Fe after coming through the youth ranks at the club. He made his competitive league debut in February 2013 in a 1–1 draw against Arsenal de Sarandí. He went onto make sixteen appearances in his first season with Unión but it ended in disappointment as his side were relegated from the 2012–13 Argentine Primera División. In two seasons in Argentina's second tier, the Primera B Nacional, he participated in forty league fixtures for Unión and scored twice before they were promoted back into the Primera División after winning Zone B in the 2014 Primera B Nacional season.

His first season back in the top-flight (2015) was an eventful one as he played twenty-one times and scored three goals but he also received the first red card of his career in a 5–2 win versus Crucero del Norte on 9 May 2015; he then received a red card in each of his next two seasons: 2016 versus Racing Club de Avellaneda and 2016–17 versus Aldosivi. On 28 December 2017, Brítez agreed to join Independiente on a loan deal commencing January 2018. His first appearance for Independiente came in a draw with Rosario Central on 24 January. In total, he appeared twenty-two times for them across two campaigns; scoring once.

Independiente terminated Brítez's loan on 8 June 2019. On 20 June, Unión Santa Fe announced they had agreed terms with Rosario Central for the transfer of the right-back; subject to personal terms and a medical. The transaction was completed on 21 June.

In late October 2020, Brítez joined Defensa y Justicia on a deal until the end of 2023. Due to lack of playing time, Brítez returned to Unión on a loan deal from Defensa, until the end of 2022.

Career statistics
.

References

External links

1992 births
Living people
Footballers from Santa Fe, Argentina
Argentine footballers
Association football defenders
Argentine Primera División players
Primera Nacional players
Campeonato Brasileiro Série A players
Unión de Santa Fe footballers
Club Atlético Independiente footballers
Rosario Central footballers
Defensa y Justicia footballers
Fortaleza Esporte Clube players